Melissa Fahn is an American actress, voice actress and singer, best known as the voice of Gaz Membrane in Invader Zim, as well as Hello Kitty in Hello Kitty's Paradise and voicing many anime and video game characters like Edward from Cowboy Bebop, Neptune from Hyperdimension Neptunia and Rider and her various other incarnations in the Fate stay/night franchise. She starred in the Broadway performance of Wicked and various theatre projects in Los Angeles.

Early life and education
Fahn is the youngest of four siblings. She performed dancing at the age of 3. Her family moved to Huntington Beach, California. Her father, a jazz drummer, encouraged her to learn singing and acting in addition to just dancing. She continued in community theater productions and toured with Young Americans. She majored in dance at California State University, Long Beach, but left after one year to devote her time to work and theater.

Career
While working as a receptionist, her voice caught the attention of a casting director for a new Betty Boop featurette, which led to her first voice-over role in The Betty Boop Movie Mystery. Fahn has voiced many animated characters, Edward in Cowboy Bebop, Haruka in Noein, Gaz as well as others in Invader Zim, and Rika Nonaka, Kristy Damon and Nene Amano in Digimon. She is the voice of Neptune in the Hyperdimension Neptunia series.

She performed live on stage worldwide in shows such as Hal Prince's 3hree, Gilligan's Island the Musical, Singin' in the Rain, No, No, Nanette and the rock-operas of Vox Lumiere.

In 2007, Fahn released her music album Avignon which was produced by her husband, Joel Alpers. The album also involved her brother Tom on trombone and sister-in-law Mary Ann McSweeney in bass. Alpers also played drums and percussion.

Wicked
Fahn was a member of the ensemble in the original Broadway cast of Stephen Schwartz's musical Wicked. In March 2004, Fahn became an understudy for the role of Glinda, replacing Melissa Bell Chait who had suffered a minor stroke. Fahn departed the show on October 31, 2004. She later became an original cast member of the Los Angeles sit-down productions, performing in the ensemble and again understudying the role of Glinda before departing on December 30, 2007.

Personal life 
Fahn has three older brothers: Mike Fahn is a musician, while Tom Fahn and Jonathan Fahn are fellow voice and stage actors. In 2000, Fahn met musician Joel Alpers in Los Angeles, and they wed at Kauai, Hawaii, in 2002.

Filmography

Animation

Film

Video games

Theater

Live action television and film

Dubbing roles

Anime

Film English

Video games

Discography
 Avignon (2007)

References

Bibliography

External links
 
 
 Melissa Fahn, Melissa Charles, Tina Dixon at Crystal Acids Voice Actor Database

Living people
Actresses from Los Angeles
American musical theatre actresses
American sopranos
American stage actresses
American video game actresses
American voice actresses
American women singers
California State University, Long Beach alumni
Singers from Los Angeles
Year of birth missing (living people)
20th-century American actresses
21st-century American actresses
20th-century American singers
21st-century American singers